Mirabilistrombus listeri, common name the Lister's snail , is a species of sea snail, a marine gastropod mollusken in the family Strombidae, the true snail.

Description
The shell size varies between 90 mm and 160 mm. When the animal is mature, the body whorl takes up over 50% of the shell's height. The pronounced projection at the end of the apertural lip is characteristic of the species (Dance, 2002).

Distribution
This species is distributed in the Northwest Indian Ocean and the Andaman Sea. It is a deep-water species. Formerly very uncommon, its population has been increasing in recent years (Dance, 2002).

References

 Walls, J.G. (1980). Conchs, tibias and harps. A survey of the molluscan families Strombidae and Harpidae. T.F.H. Publications Ltd, Hong Kong
 Rosenberg, G. 1992. Encyclopedia of Seashells. Dorset: New York. 224 pp. page(s): 65
 Dance, S.P. (2002). Shells (Smithsonian Handbooks), 2nd ed. Doring Kindersley: New York. 256 pp. page: 59

External links
 

Strombidae
Gastropods described in 1852